Elizabeth Dorothy Wuist Brown (1880-1972) was an American botanist noted for studying apogamy in plants, as well as flora of New Zealand, French Polynesia, and Hawaii.  She was married to botanist Forest Buffen Harkness Brown, with whom she was a coauthor.

Works

References 

1880 births
1972 deaths
20th-century American botanists
20th-century American women scientists